Luiz Alfredo Garcia-Roza (16 September 1936 – April 16, 2020) was a Brazilian professor and novelist, born in Rio de Janeiro. As an academic he wrote philosophy and psychology textbooks. After retiring from academia he became known as a novelist and shared the Prêmio Jabuti for Literature in 1997. He is known for his Detective fiction, in particular his Inspector Espinosa Mystery series. He had little knowledge of crime or police-work before he began writing. Some of his works have been translated into English.

Garcia-Roza died on April 16, 2020, in Rio de Janeiro.

Works in English

Inspector Espinosa mysteries
 The Silence of the Rain (2003)   [Original: O silêncio da chuva, 1996]
 December Heat (2004)  [Original: Achados e perdidos, 1998]
 Southwesterly Wind (2004)  [Original: Vento sudoeste, 1999]
 A Window in Copacabana (2006)  [Original: Uma Janela em Copacabana, 2001]
 Pursuit (2006)  [Original: Perseguido, 2003]
 Blackout (2009)  [Original: Espinosa Sem Saida, 2006]
 Alone in the Crowd (2010)  [Original: Na Multidão, 2007]

Other books in Series
 Céu de Origamis (2009)  [Portuguese]
 Freud e o Inconsciente (2009)  [Portuguese]
 L'Etrange Cas du Dr Nesse (2010)  [French]
 Fantasma (2012)  [Portuguese]
 Nuit d’orage à Copacabana (2015)  [French]

References 

1936 births
2020 deaths
21st-century Brazilian novelists
21st-century Brazilian male writers
Brazilian male novelists
Brazilian academics
Brazilian crime fiction writers
Writers from Rio de Janeiro (city)